Steve Morris may refer to:

 Steve Morris (rugby union) (1896–1965), Welsh international rugby union player
 Steve Morris (rugby league) (born 1957), Australian former rugby league footballer
 Steve Morris (soccer) (born 1967), retired Scottish association football player and coach
 Steven Morris (footballer, born 1986), Honduran footballer
 Steven Morris (Australian footballer) (born 1988), Australian rules footballer
 Steve Morris, guitarist who performed with Ian Gillan (not to be confused with Steve Morse)

See also
 Stephen Morris (disambiguation)